Colonel Brian Sherlock Gooch  (1 August 1904 – 15 April 1968) was a British Army officer of the Second World War.

Gooch was the son of Sir Thomas Vere Sherlock Gooch, 10th Baronet and Florence Meta Draper. He was educated at Eton College and Cambridge University. On 12 April 1927 he was commissioned into the Suffolk Yeomanry. He saw active service in the Second World War, during which he was mentioned in dispatches and served in the 55th Anti-Tank Regiment, Royal Artillery. Gooch was Brevet-Colonel of the Suffolk Yeomany between 1944 and 1950, and in 1946 he was awarded the Distinguished Service Order.

He held the office of Justice of the Peace in 1954. In 1956 he was High Sheriff of Suffolk and in 1958 he was Deputy Lieutenant of Suffolk.

Gooch married Monica Mary Heywood, the daughter of Nathaniel Arthur Heywood, on 6 July 1935. Together they had four children. His eldest son, Arthur Gooch, succeeded to the family baronetcy in 2008.

References

1904 births
1968 deaths
People educated at Eton College
Alumni of the University of Cambridge
British Army personnel of World War II
Companions of the Distinguished Service Order
Deputy Lieutenants of Suffolk
High Sheriffs of Suffolk
Royal Artillery officers
Suffolk Yeomanry officers